Lenisa is a monotypic moth genus of the family Noctuidae erected by Michael Fibiger, Alberto Zilli and László Aladár Ronkay in 2005. Its only species, Lenisa geminipuncta, was first described by Adrian Hardy Haworth in 1809. It is found in southern and central Europe, Lebanon, Israel, Turkey, Iraq and in the Caucasus. Some authors place this genus name as a synonym  Archanara, and the species as Archanara geminipuncta.

References

Acronictinae
Monotypic moth genera